Jeantes is a commune in the Aisne department in Hauts-de-France in northern France.

History
It has been concluded that the area was occupied during the Gallic and Gallo-Roman times due to remains found nearby. The names "Jantha" or "Janta-Curtis" were used during the 12th century.  In the 17th century, under the lordship of the Clairfontaine Abbey, the village (at the time named "Jeante-la-Ville") belonged to the Counts of Apremont until the French Revelution.

Population

Places
The village contains the Church of St. Martin, a fortified church that has been classified as a Monument Historique since 1987. The church is visited by many tourists, but particularly Dutch people.

See also
Communes of the Aisne department

References

Communes of Aisne
Aisne communes articles needing translation from French Wikipedia